Dibrugarh railway station is a railway junction station on the Lumding–Dibrugarh section.  Rated as A Category railway station in Northeast Frontier Railway. It is located in Dibrugarh :The Tea City of India and 3rd largest city in the Indian state of Assam. The Dibrugarh railway station (DBRG) is the second railway station of the historic city of Dibrugarh after Dibrugarh Town railway station (DBRT). It is the Largest railway station in Northeast India in terms of area covering approx 400 Bighas of Land. Nearest to the India's Longest Rail-Cum-Road Bogibeel Bridge which connnects Southern Bank to Northern Bank of Assam.

Overview
In her book Urban History of India: A Case Study Deepali Barua writes: "Dibrugarh was made the district headquarters in 1840. But it was not only for strategic importance that it soon became so important. The greatest interest of the British in Assam was the commerce centering around it. As early as 1823 the British discovered tea in the modern Sadiya region. It was at Chabua The Birth Place of Indian Tea, 20 miles to the east of Dibrugarh that the British made their first experiments with tea cultivation with indigenous plants. Very soon oil and coal were discovered in areas near to Dibrugarh town. Oil was discovered at Digboi in 1882 and coal was found at Margherita in 1876. All these greatly enhanced the importance of Dibrugarh as a centre of industrial, commercial, and administrative activities."

Station Facilities

Following services available in Dibrugarh Railway Station:

 02 (02 Bedded) AC Retiring Rooms with Free Wi-Fi/TV/Locker/Charging point 
 01 (02 Bedded) Non AC Retiring Rooms with Free Wi-Fi/TV/Locker/Charging point 
 01 (06 Bedded) Non AC Dormitory with Free Wi-Fi/TV/Charging point 
 Brahmaputra Lounge
 High Speed  Google Railwire Free Wi-Fi service 
 Upper Class/Lower Class Waiting Rooms having Free Wi-Fi/AC/TV/Charging points/Drinking water & separate Ladies/Gents Washrooms 
 Tea Stall 
 FOB with 2X Elevators 
 CCTV Surveillance
 Cloak Room

History

The metre-gauge railway track earlier laid by Assam Bengal Railway from Chittagong to Lumding was extended to Tinsukia on the Dibru–Sadiya line in 1903.

The project for the conversion of the Lumding–Dibrugarh section from metre gauge to  broad gauge was completed by the end of 1997.

Dibrugarh-Kanyakumari Vivek Express

The Dibrugarh–Kanyakumari Vivek Express was named in memories of Sri Swami Vivekananda Which was introduced by Former Railway Minister Smt Mamata Banerjee in the year 19th November 2011. The only train service which covers the longest route in India.

Bogibeel Bridge

The foundation of the infrastructure was laid by Former Prime Minister, Sri Atal Bihari Vajpayee in 2002, which is finally dadicated to the Nation on 25 December 2018 by Honourable Prime Minister Sri Narendra Modi.

Major trains

Major Trains available from this railway station are as follows:
 Dibrugarh-Guwahati Shatabdi Express
 New Delhi–Dibrugarh Rajdhani Express (Via New Tinsukia)
 New Delhi–Dibrugarh Rajdhani Express (Via Moranhat)
 New Delhi–Dibrugarh Rajdhani Express (Via Rangapara North)
Dibrugarh–Kanyakumari Vivek Express
Dibrugarh– Chennai Tambaram Express
Dibrugarh–Amritsar Express
Dibrugarh–Chandigarh Express
Dibrugarh - Lokmanya Tilak Terminus Superfast Express
Dibrugarh-Lalgarh Avadh Assam Express
Dibrugarh–Kolkata Superfast Express
Dibrugarh-Howrah Kamrup Express via Guwahati
Dibrugarh–Howrah Kamrup Express Via Rangapara North
Dibrugarh - Jhajha Express
New Tinsukia–Bengaluru Weekly Express

References

External links
 

Railway junction stations in Assam
Railway stations in Dibrugarh district
Tinsukia railway division
Railway stations opened in 1883
Transport in Dibrugarh